Durango is a state in Mexico.

Durango may also refer to:

Arts, media, and entertainment
 Durango (film), a 1999 drama film
 "Durango" (instrumental), by JJ Cale
 The Durango Kid (film), a 1940 western film

Electronics
 Durango Systems Corporation, a US computer company in the 1970s
 Team Durango, a British radio control car brand
 Durango, the development code name of Microsoft's Xbox One game console

Places
 Durango City (Victoria de Durango), capital city of Durango, Mexico
 Durango, Biscay, a city in Spain
 Durango, Colorado, United States
 Durango, Iowa, United States
 Durango, Texas, United States

Schools
 Durango High School (Colorado), United States
 Durango High School (Nevada), United States

Sports
 Durango (racing team), an Italian auto racing team
 Alacranes de Durango, a Mexican football club

Transportation

Vehicles
 Dodge Durango, an American mid-size SUV
 Ford Durango, an American coupe utility
 Durango 95, pseudonym of the Probe 16 car featured in the film A Clockwork Orange
 Durango-class patrol vessel, operated by the Mexican Navy

Roads and routes
 Durango Drive, a major in north–south road in the Las Vegas Valley, Nevada, United States

Stations
Durango (Mexico City Metrobús), a BRT station in Mexico City

Other uses
 Durango root (Datisca glomerata), a herb
 Durango (hotel and casino), a casino in Las Vegas, Nevada, United States

See also
 Durango Airport (disambiguation)
 Duranga, a 2022 crime thriller